WXEW (840 AM, "Victoria 840") is a radio station licensed to serve Yabucoa, Puerto Rico.  The station is owned by WXEW Radio Victoria, Inc. It airs a Spanish Variety format.

The station was assigned the WXEW call letters by the Federal Communications Commission.

Logos

References

External links
WXEW official website
Victoria 840 at MySpace

XEW
Radio stations established in 1975
1970s establishments in Puerto Rico
Yabucoa, Puerto Rico